Bad Münstereifel is a historical spa town in the district of Euskirchen, Germany, with about 17,000 inhabitants, situated in the far southwest of the German state of North Rhine-Westphalia. The little town is one of only a few historical towns in the southwest of North Rhine-Westphalia, and because of this is often overcrowded by tourists throughout spring and summer.

Geography

Location 

The River Erft flow through the town. The latter is the height of the Michelsberg, which is the highest point in the borough and rises in the northwestern part of the Ahr Hills (another region of the Eifel).

The borough is around 60 percent forested, several woods are designated as so-called ancient forest (Urwald).

Subdivisions 
Arloff, Bergrath, Berresheim, Effelsberg, Eichen, Eicherscheid, Ellesheim, Esch, Eschweiler, Gilsdorf, Hilterscheid, Hohn, Holzem, Honerath, Houverath, Hummerzheim, Hünkhoven, Iversheim, Kalkar, Bad Münstereifel, Kirspenich, Kolvenbach, Kop Nück, Langscheid, Lanzerath, Lethert, Limbach, Lingscheiderhof, Mahlberg, Maulbach, Mutscheid, Neichen, Nitterscheid, Nöthen, Odesheim, Ohlerath, Reckerscheid, Rodert, Rupperath, Sasserath, Scheuerheck, Scheuren, Schönau, Soller, Vollmert, Wald, Willerscheid, Witscheiderhof

Education 
Bad Münstereifel is the seat of SIGNO innovation society Eifel Association, Association of the greatest inventors in Germany. Signo is a project of the Federal Ministry of Economics and Technology. Joined the Association is a youth and children's department, may acquire in the children and young people in a club's workshop, the basic knowledge of technology.

Bad Münstereifel has four elementary schools in the main town as well as the subdistricts of Arloff, Mutscheid, and Houverath. A Hauptschule and Realschule share facilities, while the city has two Gymnasium: the public St. Michael-Gymnasium and the diocesan-run St.-Angela-Gymnasium. Furthermore, the Apostolic school of the Legionaries of Christ has its seat in the city.

Since 1976, the city is also home to the University of Applied Sciences for the Administration of Justice of North Rhine-Westphalia. There are also several private training facilities in the city, including the Kurt-Schumacher-Academy of the Friedrich-Ebert-Stiftung and the House of Labor Security of the Trade Association for Electrical and Precision Engineering. There is also a house of the Youth Red Cross as an educational facility for the National Association (North Division).

Bad Münstereifel has a public library with a stock of 16,000 media.

Local council
The local council has 32 seats, the  elections were held in May 2014.
 CDU: 12 seats
 SPD: 8 seats
 FDP: 4 seats
 UWV: 4 seats
 Alliance 90/The Greens: 3 seats
 The Left: 1 seat

Notable people and gatherings 

 Heino (born 1938), the folk-singer  has lived in the town. From 1996 to 2012 he operated a cafe there.
 Friedrich Joseph Haass, (1780–1853), the "holy doctor of Moscow", was born in Bad Münstereifel.
 Wilhelm Mohr (1838-1888), German journalist
 Christopher Becker (born 1980), German film director, screenwriter and film producer

The unofficial Nintendo fan convention, NCON, was held in the town's St.-Angela-Gymnasium in the early years of the 21st century.

The Portuguese Socialist Party, one of the two main Portuguese parties, was founded here in 1973 with the guidance of the Social Democratic Party of Germany, who wanted to create a political force capable of keeping Portugal a member of NATO.

Other personalities associated with the town 

 Otto Graf Lambsdorff (1926–2009), politician, former Bundesminister für Wirtschaft (Minister of Economic Affairs) and chairman of the FDP, lived in the district of Eschweiler.

International relations 

Bad Münstereifel is twinned with:
 Ashford, United Kingdom
 Fougères, France.

See also 
 Alte Burg (Bad Münstereifel) – the site of an old refuge castle
 Effelsberg 100-m Radio Telescope

References

External links 
 www.badmuenstereifel.de the official Website

Towns in North Rhine-Westphalia
Spa towns in Germany
Euskirchen (district)